Noble Township is a township in Ellsworth County, Kansas, USA.  As of the 2000 census, its population was 90.

Geography

The stream of Blood Creek runs through this township.

References
 USGS Geographic Names Information System (GNIS)

External links
 US-Counties.com
 City-Data.com

Townships in Ellsworth County, Kansas
Townships in Kansas